The 54th Norwegian Biathlon Championships were held in Trondheim from 21 March to 25 March 2012 at the stadium Saupstad Skisenter, arranged by Trondhjems Skiskyttere and Byåsen SSL. There were a total of 8 scheduled competitions: individual, sprint, mass start and relay races for men and women.

Ole Einar Bjørndalen did not participate in any races.

Schedule
All times are local (UTC+1).

Medal winners

Men

Women

References

Norwegian Biathlon Championships
2012 in biathlon
2012 in Norwegian sport